Brogo River, a perennial river that is part of the Bega River catchment, is located in the South Coast region of New South Wales, Australia.

Course and features
The river descends  over its  course.

See also

 Delta Electricity
 Rivers of New South Wales
 List of rivers of New South Wales (A–K)
 List of rivers of Australia

References

External links
 

 
 

Rivers of New South Wales
South Coast (New South Wales)